Christian Henna (born 10 March 1972) is a French former professional footballer who played as a midfielder and spent several seasons in Ligue 1 for AJ Auxerre.

References

External links
 

1972 births
Living people
French footballers
Footballers from Mulhouse
Association football midfielders
Ligue 1 players
FC Mulhouse players
AJ Auxerre players